Inscriptiones Latinae Selectae, standard abbreviation ILS, is a three-volume selection of Latin inscriptions edited by Hermann Dessau. The work was published in five parts serially from 1892 to 1916, with numerous reprints. Supporting material and notes are all written in Latin. Inscriptions are organized within chapters (capita, singular caput) by topic, such as funerary inscriptions, or inscriptions pertaining to collegia. Each inscription has an identifying number. Scholars citing a Latin inscription will often provide the ILS number in addition to a reference for the more comprehensive Corpus Inscriptionum Latinarum (CIL); for example, CIL 12.2.774—ILS 39. A concordance with CIL was published in 1950 (Rome) and 1955 (Berlin).

ILS can also be found cited as Dessau or D.

References  
 Sources
 Gordon, Arthur E. Illustrated Introduction to Latin Epigraphy. University of California Press, 1983, p. xxi online.
 Wellington, Jean Susorney. Dictionary of Bibliographic Abbreviations Found in the Scholarship of Classical Studies and Related Disciplines. Greenwood, 2003, p. 422  online.

External links
 Dessau, Hermann. Inscriptiones Latinae Selectae. Berlin 1892-1916, 3 vols.
 * vol. 1 (1892) [ILS 1 to 2956] – full text downloadable at Internet Archive
 * vol. 2, part 1 (1902) [ILS 2957 to 7210] – full text downloadable at Internet Archive
 * vol. 2, part 2 (1906) [ILS 7211 to 8883] – full text downloadable at Internet Archive
 * vol. 3 (1914/16) [ILS 8884 to 9522 + index] – full text downloadable at Internet Archive

 The searchable, online database Epigraphik-Datenbank  Clauss/Slaby includes Inscriptiones Latinae Selectae under the abbreviation D.

Latin inscriptions
Archaeological corpora